All the Colors of the Dark is a 1972 giallo film directed by Sergio Martino and starring Edwige Fenech, George Hilton and George Rigaud.  The film was also released under the alternate titles Day of the Maniac and They're Coming to Get You!.

Synopsis 
After a car accident causes her to miscarry, Jane's sister Barbara recommends seeing a psychiatrist, Dr. Burton, against the misgivings of Jane's boyfriend Richard. Jane is also still dealing with the trauma of witnessing her mother's murder at a young age. The visit ends badly and Jane instead ends up confiding in her new neighbor Mary.

Mary recommends that Jane participate in a Black Mass with Mary's sect, which she does despite several misgivings. Afterwards Jane begins to experience nightmares of a strange man and starts seeing him in her waking life, making her increasingly unable to distinguish the dream world from the real one. Despite the rituals becoming more bizarre and sexualized, Jane continues to attend the sect's rituals. When the latest ritual results in Mary's death, Jane flees in horror. The strange man appears in front of her and reveals that her mother was part of the sect and that she was murdered because she wanted to leave. He also tells her that Mary was killed for bringing in a novice. Despite these warnings Jane again tries to flee by hiding out in the countryside, only for this to end with several more deaths.

Ultimately Richard, along with the police, are able to discover that Barbara is behind the Black Masses. Not only a member of the sect, Barbara wanted to take control of their mother's legacy. Fearing for Jane's wellbeing, Richard kills Barbara and Jane is taken to the hospital. At the hospital Jane has a nightmare that Richard is killed by the sect and that it is covered up by the police, as their head is a sect member. When they return home they are attacked twice by people related to the sect, the second of which is by the leader. Richard throws him off the roof, seemingly ending the nightmare forever.

Cast 
 George Hilton as Richard Steele
 Edwige Fenech as Jane Harrison
 Ivan Rassimov as Mark Cogan
 George Rigaud as Dr. Burton 
 Susan Scott as Barbara Harrison
 Marina Malfatti as Mary Weil
 Alan Collins as Lawyer Franciscus Clay
 Julian Ugarte  as J.P. McBrian
 Dominique Boschero as Jane's Mother 
 Maria Cumani Quasimodo as  Elderly Neighbor 
 Renato Chiantoni as Mr. Main
 Tom Felleghy as Inspector Smith

Release
All the Colors of the Dark was released in Italy on 28 February 1972 where it was distributed by Interfilm. The film grossed a total of 294,470,000 Italian lire domestically.

The film was released in Spain on 27 August 1973  in Spain where it was released as Todos los colores de la oscuridad.

Critical reception 

AllMovie called the film "tiresome".

References

Footnotes

Sources

External links 
 
 All the Colors of the Dark at Variety Distribution

1972 films
Giallo films
Films directed by Sergio Martino
1970s Italian-language films
Films set in London
Films shot in London
Films with screenplays by Ernesto Gastaldi
1970s crime thriller films
Films produced by Luciano Martino
Films scored by Bruno Nicolai
1970s Italian films